"Tell Me Something I Don't Know" is a single by Canadian country music artist Charlie Major. Released in 1995, it was the second single from Major's album Lucky Man. The song reached #1 on the RPM Country Tracks chart in March 1996.

Chart performance

Year-end charts

References

1995 singles
Charlie Major songs
Songs written by Charlie Major
Songs written by Barry Brown (Canadian musician)